Frederick John Pratson (1935–1989) was an American historian and writer of travel guides. He also wrote articles for The Boston Globe travel section and for trade journals and wrote speeches for business executives. A native of Hartford, Connecticut, he graduated from Boston College in 1957. He died in December 1989, leaving a wife, four sons and two daughters.

His travel guide books covered Canada and parts of the United States. He was also an historian and contributed interviews to the Marine Folklife Centre at the University of Maine.

Guidebooks
 Guide to Western Canada
 Guide to Eastern Canada
 A Guide to Atlantic Canada
 Guide to Cape Cod
 Guide to the Great Attractions of Los Angeles and Beyond
 Guide to the Great Attractions of Orlando and Beyond
 Guide to Washington, D.C. and beyond
 Consumer's Guide to Package Travel Around the World

References

American travel writers
1935 births
1989 deaths
20th-century American non-fiction writers
20th-century American male writers
American male non-fiction writers
The Boston Globe people